The Space Launch System, shortly UFS, is a project to develop the satellite launch capability of Turkey.

The aim of the project is to support the sustainability of the national satellite programs and to reach the space independently. It consists of the building of a spaceport, the development of satellite launch vehicles as well as the establishment of remote earth stations. Contracted to the national missile manufacturer, Roketsan, on July 17, 2013, the project is currently in the pre-conceptual design phase. The Space Group Command of the Turkish Air Force, which is being formed, will operate the spaceport when it is completed.

The budget for the launch system's infrastructure is given with US$50 million and for the electronics another US$50 million.

References

Space program of Turkey
Buildings and structures under construction in Turkey
Rocket launch sites
Space launch vehicles of Turkey
Turkish Air Force